Aedia funesta or the druid is a moth of the family Erebidae. It is found in Central Europe, Southern Europe, Anatolia and Iran.

There are two generations per year. Adults are on wing from April to June and from August to October.

The larvae feed on Calystegia sepium and Convolvulus arvensis.

References

External links

Fauna Europaea
Lepiforum e.V.

Catocalini
Moths described in 1786
Moths of Europe
Moths of Asia
Taxa named by Eugenius Johann Christoph Esper